The Mammoth Hunters is an historical fiction novel by Jean M. Auel released in 1985. It is the sequel to The Valley of Horses and third in the Earth's Children series.

Plot summary

This book picks up where The Valley of Horses ends; Ayla and Jondalar meet a group known as the Mamutoi, or Mammoth Hunters, with whom they live for a period of time.  As the group's name suggests, their hosts rely on mammoth not only for food but also for building materials and a number of other commodities - and indeed for spiritual sustenance.  The protagonists make their home with the Lion Camp of the Mammoth Hunters, which features a number of respected Mamutoi.  Wisest of their nation is Old Mamut, their eldest shaman and the leader of the entire Mamutoi priesthood, who becomes Ayla's mentor and colleague in the visionary and esoteric fields of thought. Observing Ayla's affinity with horses and wolves, Mamut begins to introduce her into the ranks of the Mamuti (mystics).

Mamut is also one of the first to become aware of Ayla's unique upbringing. Many years ago, while on the Journey that all young men take for a rite of passage, he broke his arm, and was healed by the medicine woman of Ayla's Neanderthal clan (the grandmother of Ayla's adoptive mother Iza). This story is referenced in Clan of the Cave Bear as the Neanderthals rationalize Ayla's behavior in terms of what they know about "the Others" (Cro-Magnon). Mamut learned some of the Clan sign language during that stay, and became aware of the fact that the Clan are human (as opposed to other animals, as is the common opinion of most of his people).

Also within the Lion Camp is a six-year-old boy named Rydag who, like Ayla's lost son Durc, is half Clan and half Other. He was adopted by the headman's mate, Nezzie, when his mother died giving birth to him. He cannot speak, having the same vocal limitations as the Clan, but he also has their ancestral memories. Ayla quickly discovers this and teaches him, and the rest of the Lion Camp, the Clan sign language. Rydag is a sickly child, having a heart defect which limits him from even playing like the other children of the Camp. Many Mamutoi regard him as an animal, but Ayla and the Lion Camp are vehement in their defence of him. Rydag's intelligence, maturity and wit endear him to Jondalar as well, who learns to overcome his cultural prejudice towards Clan and half-Clan people.

More so than any other book in the Earth's Children series, The Mammoth Hunters relies on the tension created by the relationships between the characters to create a storyline. Ayla is susceptible to being deceived or confused; she was brought up among essentially honest people who due to their visual language are incapable of deception. She also does not know that when a man asks her to "share Pleasures" with him, she has the option of refusing, since Clan women did not. Thus, there are a number of communication failures in her relationships with members of more complex societies, especially with Jondalar, who is obstinate and passionate. Jondalar, a Zelandoni, is a foreigner among the Mamutoi, and Ayla's acceptance in their society makes him feel separated from her. The primary conflict is a love triangle between Jondalar, Ayla, and Lion Camp member Ranec. Ayla is attracted to Ranec, shares "Pleasures" with him a few times, and comes close to marrying him before several last-minute revelations reunite the former pair. Some fans have criticized author Jean Auel for making the book somewhat of a soap opera compared to her other works. The author also uses the same technique (long minutely precise descriptive passages) for common sexual activity as she uses for stone age technology (e.g. flint-shaping). At the end of this novel, Ayla and Jondalar leave for the year-long return journey to Jondalar's people, the Zelandonii, a journey detailed in The Plains of Passage and continued in The Shelters of Stone.

Characters

Lion Camp Earthlodge
 Lion Hearth
 Talut (Headman)
 Nezzie
 Danug
 Latie
 Rugie
 Rydag (half-Clan)
 Fox Hearth
 Wymez
 Ranec
 Mammoth Hearth
 Mamut (shaman)
 Ayla
 Jondalar
 Reindeer Hearth
 Manuv
 Tronie
 Tornec
 Nuvie
 Hartal
 Crane Hearth
 Crozie
 Fralie
 Frebec
 Crisavec
 Tasher
 Bectie
 Aurochs Hearth
 Tulie (Headwoman)
 Barzec
 Deegie
 Druwez
 Brinan
 Tusie
 Tarneg

References

External links
 

Earth's Children
1985 American novels
Historical novels